Peter Karim Ben Embarek is a Danish food scientist and program manager at World Health Organization (WHO) specializing in food safety and zoonoses.

Early life and education 
Ben Embarek graduated with a master of science in food science and technology and a doctorate in food safety from the Royal Veterinary and Agricultural University in Copenhagen.

Career 
Peter Ben Embarek joined the World Health Organization at its Geneva headquarters in 2001. He worked at WHO's China Office and advised the Chinese government on food safety and nutrition issues. Between 2014 and 2017, he managed WHO's MERS-CoV virus Task Force and coordinated the investigation into the animal source of the virus. He is the WHO's top expert on zoonotic diseases. In 2020, he was appointed mission head of the 13 member team of the World Health Organization's investigation into the origins of COVID-19.

On 9 February 2021, at the conclusion of his investigation, Ben Embarek said it was "extremely unlikely" that the virus leaked from a lab in Wuhan; Ben Embarak later noted that Chinese officials pressured him to include this phrase in the report. In a Danish documentary aired on August 12, 2021, Ben Embarak stated: "A lab employee infected in the field while collecting samples in a bat cave — such a scenario belongs both as a lab-leak hypothesis and as our first hypothesis of direct infection from bat to human. We’ve seen that hypothesis as a likely hypothesis".

Awards 
Ben Embarek is a fellow of the International Academy of Food Science and Technology under the International Union of Food Science and Technology. He is also the recipient of the 2017 Scientific Spirit Award of the Chinese Institute of Food Science and Technology.

References 

Danish scientists
World Health Organization officials
Responses to the COVID-19 pandemic
Living people
Year of birth missing (living people)